Tyrel James "Ty" Griffith (born December 22, 1985) is a Canadian curler from Kelowna, British Columbia.

Personal life
Griffith was born in Calgary. He is employed as a Canada golf operations manager/PGA of Canada  Golf professional at the Black Mountain Golf Club. He is married.

Teams

References

External links
 

1985 births
Curlers from British Columbia
Living people
Curlers from Calgary
Sportspeople from Kelowna
Canadian male curlers
Canada Cup (curling) participants